Virginia Anna Adeleid Weidler (March 21, 1927 – July 1, 1968) was an American child actress, popular in Hollywood films during the 1930s and 1940s.

Early life and career
Weidler was born on March 21, 1927, in Eagle Rock, Los Angeles County, California; she was the sixth and final child born to Alfred Weidler, an architect, and Margaret Weidler (born Margarete Therese Louise Radon, 1890–1987), a former opera singer. She was the second Weidler child born in the United States after the family emigrated from Germany in 1923.

She made her first film appearance in 1931. Her first credited role was as Europena in Mrs. Wiggs of the Cabbage Patch (1934) a role she won at age seven after having been seen in the play Autumn Crocus. Virginia made a big impression on audiences as the little girl who would "hold my breath 'til I am black in the face" to get her way.

For the next several years, she appeared in many memorable films from George Stevens's Laddie (1935) to a pivotal supporting role in Souls at Sea (1938) starring Gary Cooper and George Raft. Despite being under contract to Paramount, just as many of her roles of the period took place while on loan to RKO-Radio Pictures.

When Paramount did not extend her contract, she was signed by Metro-Goldwyn-Mayer in 1938. Her first film for MGM was with their leading male star Mickey Rooney in Love Is a Headache (1938). The film was a success and Weidler was later cast in larger roles. She was one of the all-female cast of the 1939 film The Women, as the daughter of Norma Shearer's character.

Her next major success was The Philadelphia Story (1940) in which she played Dinah Lord, the witty younger sister of Tracy Lord (Katharine Hepburn). Her film career ended with the 1943 film Best Foot Forward.

At her retirement from the screen at age 16, she had appeared in more than 40 films, and had acted with some of the biggest stars of the day, including Clark Gable and Myrna Loy in Too Hot to Handle, Bette Davis in All This and Heaven Too, and Judy Garland in Babes on Broadway.

Family

In addition to her parents, Virginia had three brothers and two sisters. Her brothers Warner (born Werner), Walter (born Wolfgang), and George were successful musicians after some child-acting work, eventually owning their own recording studio. Her brother George was married to singer-actress Doris Day from 1946–49 (his first marriage, her second). Her sisters, Sylvia (born Waltraud) and Renee (born Verena), also were involved in show business prior to their marriages.

Her father turned his architectural skills into a career building miniature sets for 20th Century Fox.

Marriage
On March 27, 1947, aged 20, Weidler married Lionel Krisel. They had two sons, Ron and Gary.

Death
After her retirement, Weidler gave no interviews for the remainder of her life. She was married to Krisel until her death at age 41 in Los Angeles on July 1, 1968. Weidler suffered from a heart ailment for many years and died of a heart attack.

Legacy
While not the box-office draw of Fox's Shirley Temple or Jane Withers, Virginia Weidler still has a loyal following to this day. In 2012, the Virginia Weidler Remembrance Society was created to honor her life and career.

In late 2016, the Los Angeles City Council honored Weidler by proclaiming March 21, 2017, which would have been her 90th birthday, as A Celebration of Virginia Weidler.

Partial filmography

Radio appearances

References

Bibliography
 Best, Marc. Those Endearing Young Charms: Child Performers of the Screen. South Brunswick and New York: Barnes & Co., 1971, pp. 260–264.
 Parish, James Robert. Great Child Stars. New York: Ace Books, 1976.
 Willson, Dixie. Little Hollywood Stars. Akron, OH, e New York: Saalfield Pub. Co., 1935.

External links
 Virginia Weidler — Grave

 

1927 births
1968 deaths
American child actresses
American film actresses
American people of German descent
Actresses from Los Angeles
Metro-Goldwyn-Mayer contract players
20th-century American actresses